The Athletics at the 2016 Summer Paralympics – Men's 200 metres T11 event at the 2016 Paralympic Games took place on 13–15 September 2016, at the Estádio Olímpico João Havelange.

Heats

Heat 1 
18:45 13 September 2016:

Heat 2 
18:52 13 September 2016:

Heat 3 
18:59 13 September 2016:

Heat 4 
19:06 13 September 2016:

Semifinals

Semifinal 1 
11:51 14 September 2016:

Semifinal 2 
11:57 14 September 2016:

Final 
17:51 15 September 2016:

Notes

Athletics at the 2016 Summer Paralympics
2016 in men's athletics